Nowy Świat (meaning "New World" in Polish) is a street in Warsaw.

Nowy Świat may also refer to the following places in Poland:
Nowy Świat, part of the Stare Miasto district of Kraków 
Nowy Świat, Konin County in Greater Poland Voivodeship (west-central Poland)
Nowy Świat, Nowy Tomyśl County in Greater Poland Voivodeship (west-central Poland)
Nowy Świat, Kościan County in Greater Poland Voivodeship (west-central Poland)
Nowy Świat, Leszno County in Greater Poland Voivodeship (west-central Poland)
Nowy Świat, Gmina Kawęczyn in Greater Poland Voivodeship (west-central Poland)
Nowy Świat, Gmina Tuliszków in Greater Poland Voivodeship (west-central Poland)
Nowy Świat, Lublin Voivodeship (east Poland)
Nowy Świat, Poddębice County in Łódź Voivodeship (central Poland) 
Nowy Świat, Wieluń County in Łódź Voivodeship (central Poland)
Nowy Świat, Międzyrzecz County in Lubusz Voivodeship (west Poland)
Nowy Świat, Zielona Góra County in Lubusz Voivodeship (west Poland)
Nowy Świat, Masovian Voivodeship in Masovian Voivodeship (east-central Poland) 
Nowy Świat, Opole Voivodeship (south-west Poland)
Nowy Świat, Pomeranian Voivodeship (north Poland)
Nowy Świat ship canal, Vistula Spit, Northern Poland